Ricky Jerome Whittle is a former professional American football player who played running back for one season for the New Orleans Saints.

1971 births
Living people
Sportspeople from Fresno, California
Players of American football from California
American football running backs
New Orleans Saints players
Oregon Ducks football players